Cydrela is a genus of spiders in the family Zodariidae. It was first described in 1873 by Thorell. , it contains 17 species from a variety of places in Asia and Africa.

Species
Cydrela comprises the following species:
 C. albopilosa Simon & Fage, 1922 — East Africa
 C. decidua Dankittipakul & Jocqué, 2006 — Thailand
 C. escheri (Reimoser, 1934) — India
 C. friedlanderae Hewitt, 1914 — South Africa
 C. insularis (Pocock, 1899) — Yemen (Socotra)
 C. kenti Lessert, 1933 — Angola
 C. linzhiensis (Hu, 2001) — China
 C. nasuta Lessert, 1936 — Mozambique
 C. nitidiceps (Simon, 1905) — India
 C. otavensis Lawrence, 1928 — Namibia
 C. pristina Dankittipakul & Jocqué, 2006 — Thailand
 C. schoemanae Jocqué, 1991 — South Africa
 C. spinifrons Hewitt, 1915 — South Africa
 C. spinimana Pocock, 1898 — South Africa
 C. stigmatica (Simon, 1876) — Tanzania (Zanzibar)
 C. stillata (Simon, 1905) — India
 C. unguiculata (O. Pickard-Cambridge, 1871) (type) — South Africa

References

Zodariidae
Araneomorphae genera
Spiders of Asia
Spiders of Africa